APD is an initialism that may refer to:

Medicine
 Afferent pupillary defect
Acid Peptic Disease
 Ambulatory Peritoneal Dialysis
 Aminohydroxypropylidene bisphosphonate (APD, Aredia)
 Antipsychotic Drugs
 Auditory processing disorder
some personality disorders carry the abbreviation PD:  
 Antisocial personality disorder
 Avoidant personality disorder

other meaning for the abbreviation:

 Antimicrobial peptide database
 Autoimmune progesterone dermatitis
 Action Potential Duration

Law enforcement
 Aboriginal Police Directorate (Canada)
 Airport Police Division (Singapore)
 Akron Police Department
 Albany Police Department (Oregon)
 Albuquerque Police Department
 Amtrak Police Department
 Anaheim Police Department
 Anchorage Police Department
 Annapolis Police Department
 Antioch Police Department
 Apopka Police Department
 Arcadia Police Department
 Asheville Police Department
 Atascadero Police Department
 Atlanta Police Department
 Aurora Police Department (Colorado)
 Austin Police Department

Other
 Air Passenger Duty, an excise duty levied on passengers flying from UK airports
 APD, NYSE stock symbol for Air Products & Chemicals
 APD, reporting mark for the Albany Port Railroad
 Alianza por la Democracia (Alliance for Democracy (Dominican Republic)), a Dominican Republic political party
 Alpha Phi Delta, an American college fraternity
 APD, National Rail code for Appledore (Kent) railway station 
 APD-40, a stretch of highway near Cleveland, Tennessee
 A designation for highways that are part of the Appalachian Development Highway System (ADHS).
 Association de la paix par le droit, a French pacifist organisation 
 Avalanche photodiode, a device for counting photons
 Apple Accessory Products Division, former name for The Keyboard Company, Inc.
 APD, U.S. Navy type designation for High-speed transport vessels
 ACPI Platform Description, specification of computer hardware under the Advanced Configuration and Power Interface
 Accredited Practicing Dietitian, a certificate issued by Dietitians Australia 
 APD : Application permit to drill
 APD : All Paths Down 
 APD : American Political Development
Advanced Planning Document - Used in state procurement of federal money in the United States.